Greek Baseball league is the top amateur baseball league in Greece. The inaugural season was held in 2000 and the first champions were Marousi 2004. The season begins every March and concludes every November with the finals, a best-of-five series. Games are played exclusively on weekends. In 2014, the Greek government decided the abolition of Greek Baseball Federation due to low number of active clubs in this sport.

Greek Champions

Performance by club

References

Baseball competitions in Greece
Baseball leagues in Europe
baseball